Neuroscience & Biobehavioral Reviews is a peer-reviewed scientific journal covering behavioral neuroscience published by Elsevier. The journal publishes reviews, theoretical articles, and mini-reviews. It is an official journal of the International Behavioral Neuroscience Society.

Abstracting and indexing  
The journal is abstracted and indexed by BIOSIS, Current Contents/Life Sciences, EMBASE, MEDLINE, Science Citation Index, and Scopus. According to the Journal Citation Reports, Neuroscience & Biobehavioral Reviews has a 2020 impact factor of 8.989.

References

External links 

 

Neuroscience journals
Elsevier academic journals
English-language journals
Publications established in 1977
International Behavioral Neuroscience Society academic journals